Aankhon Aankhon Mein is a 1972 Hindi movie produced by J. Om Prakash and directed by Raghunath Jhalani. The film stars Rakesh Roshan, Raakhee, Pran and Dara Singh. The film's music is by Shankar Jaikishan.  Raakhee earned a Filmfare nomination as Best Actress, the only nomination for the film.

Cast
 Tarun Bose as Kulwant Rai
 Achala Sachdev as Shobha Rai, his second wife
 Rakesh Roshan as Rakesh Rai, Kulwant's son by his late first wife
 Pankaj as Naresh Rai, son of Kulwant and Shobha
 Krishan Dhawan as Mamaji (uncle), brother of Shobha Rai
 Rakhee Gulzar as Parvati, Rakesh's love interest
 Brahm Bhardwaj as Rakesh's employer in Himachal Pradesh
 Pran as Thakur Shiv Prasad, the tribal chief
 Raj Mehra as Seth Ram Prasad
 Dara Singh as Pahelwan
 Shivraj as Sunderlal
 Tun Tun as Mrs. Pereira
 Jayshree T. as Dancer

Soundtrack

References

External links 
 

1972 films
1970s Hindi-language films
Indian romantic drama films
Films scored by Shankar–Jaikishan